Vita Silchenko (born 19 February 1967) is a Belarusian fencer. She competed in the women's individual foil event at the 2004 Summer Olympics.

References

1967 births
Living people
Belarusian female foil fencers
Olympic fencers of Belarus
Fencers at the 2004 Summer Olympics
Sportspeople from Minsk